Flashpoint is a Canadian crime drama television series created by Mark Ellis and Stephanie Morgenstern. The series debuted on July 11, 2008, on CTV. In the United States, the series originally aired on CBS; it also aired on Ion Television. The series starred Hugh Dillon, Amy Jo Johnson, David Paetkau, Sergio Di Zio, and Enrico Colantoni.

The show focuses on a fictional elite tactical unit, the Strategic Response Unit (SRU), within a Canadian metropolitan police force (styled on the Toronto Police Emergency Task Force). The SRU are tasked to resolve extreme situations that regular officers are not trained to handle, including hostage-taking, bomb threats, and heavily armed criminals. Although the team is seldom seen doing so, they do sometimes discuss the "day job" of serving high-risk arrest warrants. Equipped with high-tech tools and a cache of weapons and explosives, members use negotiation tactics and intuition to try to avoid the use of deadly force, which they exert only as a last resort. The initiation of a given situation is often determined by a split-second decision, hence the show's title.

On January 25, 2011, it was announced that Ion Television had acquired all rights to the show held by CBS, including the option to continue production. On May 1, 2012, the producers announced that the fifth season would be the last of the series. The series finale aired on December 13, 2012.

Plot 
Flashpoint follows the lives of several officers working for an elite police tactical unit known as the Strategic Response Unit (SRU), which is called in by regular police to resolve situations beyond their control.

Cast 

The majority of the cast of Flashpoint are Canadians, including Enrico Colantoni, David Paetkau, Hugh Dillon, Sergio Di Zio, Michael Cram, Mark Taylor, and Ruth Marshall. Amy Jo Johnson is the only American. Johnson said she had no problems with the physical demands of the show despite being pregnant with her first child with her fiancé Oliver Giner during initial production of Flashpoint. Ruth Marshall left the series after Season 1 and Mark Taylor left after the tenth episode of the second season after his character, Lou, died. During Amy Jo Johnson's maternity leave (during which her character was hospitalized with a gunshot wound), she was temporarily replaced by Jessica Steen, who played Donna Sabine. Steen left the main cast in the sixth episode of the second season, when Johnson's character returned full-time, although she has appeared in some later episodes. Taylor was replaced by Oluniké Adeliyi, who portrays Leah Kerns as of the second episode of the second season. In the fifth episode of the fourth season, Michael Cram, known as "Wordy," left the show when his character was diagnosed with Parkinson's disease. Cram was replaced by Clé Bennett, portraying Rafik Rousseau. This character left by the first episode of the fifth season. Two episodes later, Adeliyi's character returned to Team One. In an interview, the show's creators stated that they liked to cast only Canadians in Flashpoint; the only non-Canadians who have been on the show are Amy Jo Johnson, Colin Cunningham, and Ben Bass.

Episodes

Production 
Flashpoint began life in 2005 as a part of a CTV project that encouraged actors to submit scripts to the network. The original Flashpoint script (known earlier as Sniper and Critical Incident) 1 was for a two-hour TV movie. A pilot episode was produced for CTV in July 2007 under the Critical Incident title featuring most of the cast of what would become the series, but without the characters Jules Callaghan and Lewis Young; the characters in the pilot were Kate Travers and Robert "Shakes" Boneyman. CTV's interest in the project led to Flashpoint'''s being reworked as a regular CTV series, which was approved in mid-December 2007. The show was unaffected by the 2007–08 WGA strike because WGC rules allow any members of the WGC living in Canada, including writers with dual WGA/WGC membership, to write for Canadian productions. Writers living in the US with dual WGA/WGC membership were required to get a waiver from the WGA to work on Canadian productions during the strike.

Although originally developed for a Canadian audience, it was announced on January 29, 2008, that American network CBS had purchased the rights to air the series in the United States, making it the second Canadian TV series aired in primetime on a US broadcast network after Due South, also a CTV show aired by CBS. In addition, Flashpoint is the first Canadian series aired by a major U.S. broadcast network set entirely in Canada (as Due South was primarily set in Chicago but filmed in Toronto). On March 5, 2008, CBS announced that Flashpoint would premiere in July. CTV announced on May 8, 2008, that it would simulcast the show in Canada beginning on July 11. Flashpoint began filming 13 episodes on April 17, 2008. It was written and created by Mark Ellis and Stephanie Morgenstern and executive produced by multiple Gemini Award-winner Anne Marie La Traverse for Pink Sky Entertainment and Bill Mustos for Avamar Entertainment, in association with the CTV Television Network and CBS Television Studios (formerly CBS Paramount Network Television). The pilot episode, titled "Scorpio" was based on an actual event that occurred in Toronto in 2004, in which a gun-wielding hostage-taker was shot and killed by an Emergency Task Force (TPS) sniper. Ellis and Morgenstern wrote their teleplay for the episode after interviewing members of the ETF. The majority of the episode reused substantial portions of the unaired Critical Incident pilot together with new footage featuring Amy Jo Johnson and Mark Taylor (who were not in the pilot). Director David Frazee carefully shot the SRU as one unit to demonstrate their unity. Producer Anne Marie La Traverse said the show would take people to their "own personal flash point." David Paetkau, one of the show's regular cast members, said Flashpoint "tries to capture the human element involved in policing, and discusses how some officers end up with emotional baggage and suffer with mental illnesses like post traumatic stress disorder." Input and advice from various ETF personnel were used in making the series.

On August 25, 2008, CTV announced it had renewed the show for a second season of 13 episodes to begin production in Toronto in early 2009. Some months later, both CTV and CBS increased the renewal to 18 episodes. According to tvguide.com, CBS announced that Flashpoint would return January 9, 2009, at 9 pm for a midseason start. In the United States and Canada, the remaining four episodes that were originally produced for Season 1 aired as a part of Season 2. CTV in Canada originally considered these episodes as part of Season 1; however, after the airing of the fourth episode (which was originally considered the final episode of Season 1), CTV changed the labelling of these four episodes and, following CBS, began considering them part of Season 2. CBS and CTV both ended Season 2 on May 25, 2009, after airing only the first nine episodes produced. The second nine episodes, filmed from May to August 2009, were originally aired in Canada by CTV as Season 3. CTV has since officially begun to refer to the episodes as the second half of Season 2 (and altered its Flashpoint website accordingly). These episodes began airing June 4, 2010, on CBS, where they are considered part of Season 3.

A new group of 13 episodes, now referred to by both CTV and the production companies as "Season 3", was commissioned by CTV and CBS in October 2009. The first of these episodes began filming on January 13, 2010. This gave CBS 22 original episodes to broadcast while CTV had 13. CBS completed broadcasting Season 2 on July 30, 2010. The third season premiered on July 16, 2010, on both CTV and CBS. After entering a hiatus in mid-September after the broadcast of seven episodes from Season 3, CTV resumed airing the remaining episodes on January 4, 2011. CTV ordered a fourth season of Flashpoint on June 3, 2010, before the third season began to air. On January 21, 2011, it was announced that CBS would air 7 of the 18 episodes from Season 4, as well as the remaining 6 episodes from Season 3 not yet shown on CBS, during the summer of 2011. Due to the cancellation of CHAOS, the remaining episodes from Season 3 of Flashpoint were shown on CBS starting May 6, 2011. The remaining 11 episodes from season 4 began airing on ION Television in October of that year.

Filming of season four took place between February 14 and September 15, 2011. On May 9, 2011, CTV announced that the fourth season would begin airing on June 17, 2011, to be simulcast by CBS. On June 1, 2011, Bell Media announced that the network ordered another season of Flashpoint, containing 18 new episodes. starting to air in Canada in September 2012. Filming of season 5 took place between February 9 and June 27, 2012.
The show producers later revealed that the order had been shortened to 13 episodes. On May 1, 2012, the producers announced on their Facebook page that they had decided the fifth season would be their last. CTV confirmed the reduction in the episode order and the ending of the show on May 1.

 Setting 

While initially and according to Enrico Colantoni, the setting for the show was not identified, a Canadian flag was included on the officer's uniforms. As the show has progressed, the setting has become more significantly identifiable. This is especially true of the third season. Toronto landmarks, such as the CN Tower and York University, a fictional Toronto Interpreter newspaper (designed in the style of the Toronto Star, though "The Star" was mentioned during the premiere of Season 3) and Toronto Transit Commission stations and patrol cars are now regularly shown, identical to a Toronto Police Service vehicle but without the city name and with a fake division number. Various episodes show ex-Toronto police cars with the Toronto police logo still on them and SRU HQ has a flag with the Toronto Police logo on it.  Dialogue also references Tim Hortons, and local streets, as well as communities within the Greater Toronto Area.

In the first episode, someone mentions that the character Sam Braddock was previously in JTF2, which is a Canadian Forces special operations unit. Similarly, in "He Knows His Brother", a subject's gun is described as a family heirloom carried by his grandfather on D-Day on Juno Beach, which was mainly fought by Canadian military.

In "Between Heartbeats", a shooting victim is carried to an ambulance by a paramedic whose shirt reads "Toronto EMS Paramedic" and in the seventh episode of the third season ("You Think You Know Someone"), a news article reveals the city's name. At the end of that episode, firefighters with "Toronto" emblazoned on the back of their uniform overcoats are seen.

In the episode "No Promises" of season 3, firefighters have "Toronto" on the back of their overcoats with the Toronto fire logo on the side of their overcoats. In the second-season episode "Clean Hands", Toronto Pearson International Airport is shown. In season 3, episode 2 "Never Let You Down" Sgt. Parker is being briefed about a possible hostage situation by Officer K. Travers. Officer Traver's hat badge clearly states "Metropolitan Toronto Police" (7:33 mark in the video). In the episode "He Knows His Brother", there is a brief scene in a military school in which Canadian Forces combat uniforms are being worn, as are berets sporting the cap badges of the Royal Canadian Regiment (RCR), a regular force Canadian infantry unit. Police forces in York and Durham Regions are mentioned in "Exit Wounds".

The fourth episode of the third season features a shot of an Ontario driver's licence with a Toronto address which is visited by the SRU officers. the name "Toronto" is finally spoken for the first time in the series in the second part of the Season 2 finale, "Behind the Blue Line", in reference to the city's professional hockey team, the Toronto Maple Leafs.

In the first part of the series finale, police forces in Peel and Halton, as well as the aforementioned York and Durham police are brought up as reinforcement by Sgt. Parker. Also, the city's name is shown and mentioned twice, first in a caption that reads "Toronto City Hall" and then when a dispatcher calls for crews to be sent to Toronto immediately. CFB Borden is also mentioned as providing a triage hospital and troops.

At the start of the series, Bill Mustos, founder of co-production company Avamar Entertainment, commented that "you're not going to see a show that is screaming 'Canada.' It's a show in a big sophisticated urban city where crises take place. The stories we're trying to tell are universal stories." CTV's press release regarding the series did identify Toronto and noted that the SRU is based on Toronto's Emergency Task Force.

 Music 
The show's 30-second theme was written by Amin Bhatia and Ari Posner. The music of Hugh Dillon, Matthew Good, Amy Jo Johnson and Kim Taylor have also been used in the show's soundtrack. Johnson's song "Dancing In-between" was used in the ending of episode six of the first season, "Attention Shoppers," with Dillon's "Lost at Sea" used to conclude the eighth episode, "Never Kissed a Girl." The song "Open Your Eyes" by Tracenine was featured in the episode Perfect Storm. Songs from Hugh Dillon can also be heard in season two episode twelve "Just a Man" (song "Don't Be Fooled") and the episode that concluded season three, "Fault Lines" (song "My Mistakes"). "Goodbye," a song written and performed by Amy Jo Johnson, features in season three episode ten, "Terror."

 Crossover Flashpoint crossed over with The Listener, when the Flashpoint character Michaelangelo "Spike" Scarlatti was leaving the hospital after receiving medical attention and interacted with The Listener character Osman "Oz" Bey who had just brought a patient to the hospital.

 Ratings and reception 

 Canada 
Note that each Canadian television season starts with the Monday of the week that includes the first day of September.

The pilot episode was watched on CTV by 1.11million viewers, earning the No. 1 spot in its timeslot. Flashpoint drew in 1,216,000 viewers during the week of July 28, 2008. It gained a bit more audience when the show drew in 1,300,000 viewers. In ratings for the week of February 23, 2009, Flashpoint has been watched by 1,339,000 viewers. CTV announced that a new series of Flashpoint episodes would air in the fall of 2009 on Friday nights at 10:00pm ET. These episodes would not be simulcast with CBS. After CBS delayed broadcasting the episodes from summer 2009 to mid-season 2010, CTV initially backed off its commitment to fall 2009. Eventually in late August, CTV announced that the new episodes would premiere in Canada on September 25, 2009. It marked the first time CTV broadcast new Flashpoint episodes out of simulcast with CBS in the United States. The last original Flashpoint episode for the Canadian fall 2009 season was broadcast on November 20, 2009. Two Flashpoint episodes from the first season—"Attention Shoppers" and "Who's George?"—were nominated as finalists in the 2009 WGC Screenwriting Awards.

 United States The Boston Globe praised Flashpoint for using emotion that "lingers on the psychic toll that such high-tension work can take." The pilot episode was watched on CBS by 8.23million people, earning the No. 1 ranking for the hour. According to Flashpoint executive Bill Mustos in August 2008, the success of the show in the U.S. was not due to the Writer's Guild strikes, but mainly because of the need of having a new kind of show on television. Flashpoint did well in its initial airings on Friday nights (in the time slot normally given to Numb3rs), building on the lead-in from that show, to the point that it drew more viewers on Friday nights than Swingtown, another new drama, did on the normally busier Thursday nights, which prompted CBS to move Flashpoint to Thursday nights in an attempt to further build its audience. On December 2, 2008, CBS announced that they would begin airing the second season of Flashpoint on January 9, 2009. A third season of Flashpoint was to have aired as a midseason replacement during CBS's 2009–2010 schedule; however, CBS announced it would air these episodes during the summer of 2009 beginning on July 17, 2009, instead of its previously announced 2010 timetable. On July 7, 2009, CBS rescinded its decision and the show aired midseason after all. These were the same episodes that CTV broadcast in Canada during the fall 2009 season. CBS began airing these episodes on June 4, 2010. The remainder of the third season was broadcast on CBS beginning May 6, 2011. On Metacritic, Flashpoint got mixed to average reviews scoring 51 out of 100 on the site's metascore.

 Awards and nominations 

 Home media 
In DVD region 1, Phase 4 Films released all five seasons on DVD in Canada, while in the US CBS DVD (distributed by Paramount Home Entertainment) has released the first four seasons; the final season was released on March 18, 2014. On November 5, 2013, Phase 4 Films released Flashpoint: The Complete Series on DVD in Canada. The 19-disc set features all 75 episodes of the series as well as bonus features. In Region 2, ITV DVD released the complete first season on DVD in the UK on April 13, 2009. In France, Koba Films has released the first three seasons on DVD. In Region 3, STG Multimedia released the complete first season on DVD in Thailand on April 9, 2011. The complete second season was released on May 20, 2011. In Region 4, Hopscotch Entertainment has released the first three seasons on DVD in Australia.

 International distribution Flashpoint'' is being distributed by Alchemy Television, based in New York, and Tele München Group to all international markets outside of North America. Already in July 2008, it was announced that the two distributors had sold the series to TV networks in 50 countries outside Canada and the US, among them Tv2 in New Zealand, ITV3 and Universal Channel (UK) in the United Kingdom, and networks in France, Austria (ORF), Germany, Switzerland, Italy (RAI), Spain, Finland, Iceland, Sweden, Norway, the Netherlands, Belgium, Croatia, and Latin America. By December 2008, only nine of the 13 episodes produced during the series' first season had been aired in North America, although all 13 episodes had been aired by New Zealand's TV2 as of December 10, 2008. The Australian premiere occurred on January 11, 2009, when Nine Network took the unusual step of screening the second episode in isolation ahead of the season. It followed a cricket telecast in a relatively late Sunday night timeslot. Nine aired the show on Wednesday nights, its regular time slot, where episodes were erratically shown out of their intended order. Nine took the show off air soon after, but it returned to air during summer non-ratings on Monday November 30, 2009, at 9.30 pm and was taken off air again only two weeks later.  In Latin America, the series debuted in Mexico in TV Azteca in 2012. The first three seasons have been already aired. In Thailand, the series aired in Channel 5 on February 25, 2016.

See also
 S.W.A.T. (2017 TV series) – Similar concept but focused on the LAPD's elite SWAT team

References

External links 

 
 
 
 

 
2008 Canadian television series debuts
2012 Canadian television series endings
2000s Canadian crime drama television series
2010s Canadian crime drama television series
English-language television shows
Canadian police procedural television series
Television shows filmed in Toronto
Television shows set in Toronto
Television series by Bell Media
Television series by CBS Studios
CTV Television Network original programming
CTV 2 original programming
CBS original programming
Ion Television original programming
Gemini and Canadian Screen Award for Best Drama Series winners